The Requiem is a Roman Catholic liturgical service.

Requiem may also refer to:

Ballet
 Requiem (Baynes) (2001)
 Requiem (Eifman) (1998)
 Requiem (MacMillan) (1976)
 Requiem (Rushton), a 2006 ballet by Tim Rushton

Film
 Requiem (1982 film), a Hungarian film
 Requiem (1995 film), an American short film
 Requiem for a Dream (2000 film), an American psychological tragedy film
 Requiem (2006 film), a German film about exorcism
 Aliens vs. Predator: Requiem, a 2007 science fiction film

Literature
 Requiem (Anna Akhmatova), a lyrical cycle of elegy by Anna Akhmatova
 Requiem (Fisher novel), a 1933 novel by A. E. Fisher
 Requiem (Gō novel), a 1972 novel by Shizuko Gō
 Requiem (book), a 1992 Robert A. Heinlein retrospective
 Requiem: A Hallucination, a 1991 novel by Antonio Tabucchi
 Requiem (Young novel), a 2008 historical fiction novel by Robyn Young
 "The Requiem" (short story), an 1886 story by Anton Chekhov
 "Requiem" (short story), a short story by Robert A. Heinlein
 Requiem Chevalier Vampire, a French comics series by Pat Mills
 Silver Surfer: Requiem, a Marvel Knight's limited series by J. Michael Straczynski
 Requiem (DC Comics), a comic book series based on the character Artemis of Bana-Mighdall
 Requiem, a book about photographers killed in the Vietnam War, co-edited by Horst Faas and Tim Page
 "Requiem", a comic book tie-in to Final Crisis
 "Requiem", a poem by Robert Louis Stevenson

Music

Compositions
 Requiem (Berlioz)
 A German Requiem (Brahms)
 Requiem (Bruckner)
 Requiem (Cherubini)
 Requiem (Delius)
 Requiem (Duruflé)
 Requiem (Dvořák)
 Requiem (Fauré)
 Requiem (Harbison)
 Requiem (Michael Haydn)
 Requiem (Henze)
Requiem (Howells)
 Requiem (Jenkins)
 Requiem (Ligeti)
 Requiem (Lloyd Webber)
 Requiem (Martin)
 Requiem (Mozart)
 Requiem (Ockeghem)
 Requiem for my friend (Preisner)
 Requiem (Reger)
 Requiem (Rouse)
 Requiem (Rutter)
 Requiem (Saint-Saëns)
 Requiem (Tishchenko)
 Requiem (Verdi)
 Requiem (Weinberg)
 War Requiem

Albums
 Requiem (The Autumn Offering album) (2009)
 Requiem (Bathory album) (1994)
 Requiem (Bracket album) (2005)
 Requiem (The Confession album) (2007)
 Requiem (The Getaway Plan album) (2011)
 Requiem (Goat album) (2016)
 Requiem (John 5 album) (2008)
 Requiem (Karl Jenkins album) (2005)
 Requiem (Killing Joke album) (2009)
 Requiem (Korn album) (2022)
 Requiem (Jón Leifs)
 Requiem (Branford Marsalis album) (1999)
 Requiem (William Parker album) (2006)
 Requiem (Verdena album) (2007)
 Requiem, a 2005 album by Skarp
 Requiem, a trilogy of albums by Virgin Black

Songs
 "Requiem" (Alma song) (2017)
 "Requiem" (Killing Joke song) (1980)
 "Requiem" (London Boys song) (1988)
 "Requiem", a song by Avenged Sevenfold from Hail to the King
 "Requiem", a song by Cave In from Jupiter
 "Requiem", a song by Devin Townsend from Empath
 "Requiem", a song by Jethro Tull from Minstrel in the Gallery
 "Requiem", a song by Lamb of God from Sacrament
 "Requiem", a song by Make Them Suffer from Old Souls
 "Requiem", a song by Opeth from Orchid
 "Requiem", a song by Paradise Lost from In Requiem
 "Requiem (We Will Remember)", a 1991 song by Saxon from Solid Ball of Rock
 "Requiem", a song by Structures from Life Through a Window
 "Requiem", a song by Trivium from Ember to Inferno
 "Requiem", a song featuring Cory Taylor from Strait Up
 "Requiem", a song from the 2015 stage musical Dear Evan Hansen
 "Requiem", a song by Đorđe Balašević from Panta Rei

Television
 Requiem (TV series), a 2018 BBC drama serial
 "Requiem" (NCIS), an episode of NCIS
 "Requiem" (Sanctuary), an episode of Sanctuary
 "Requiem" (Sliders), an episode of Sliders
 "Requiem" (The West Wing), an episode of The West Wing
 "Requiem" (The X-Files), an episode of The X-Files
 "Requiem", a 2017 episode of The Blacklist
 "Requiem", an episode of Dungeons & Dragons
 "Requiem", a 2008 episode of Smallville
"Requiem," an episode of Teenage Mutant Ninja Turtles

Video games
 Requiem: Avenging Angel, a 1999 PC game
 Vampire: The Requiem, a 2004 role-playing game
 Requiem: Memento Mori, a 2007 PC game
 Penumbra: Requiem, a 2008 expansion to the game Penumbra: Black Plague
 A Plague Tale: Requiem, a 2022 sequel to the game A Plague Tale: Innocence

Other uses
 Requiem (typeface), an old-style serif font
 Requiem shark, a classification of sharks
 Requiem Studio, an audio effects production company
 Requiem Stand, a manifestation of supernatural powers in JoJo's Bizarre Adventure

See also
 Music written for the Requiem Mass
 Requiem (comics), a list of comics topics
 Requiem Canticles (disambiguation)
 Requiem for a Dream, a 2000 American drama film